The Embassy of the People's Republic of China in Turkey is the diplomatic mission of China to Turkey.

See also 
 Embassy of Turkey, Beijing
 List of ambassadors of China to Turkey
 China-Turkey relations

References

External links 
  Embassy of China in Ankara

China–Turkey relations
Ankara
China